Bachhwara Assembly constituency is an assembly constituency in Begusarai district in the Indian state of Bihar.

Overview
As per Delimitation of Parliamentary and Assembly constituencies Order, 2008, No. 142 Bachhwara Assembly constituency is composed of the following:  Bachhwara, Mansoorchak and Bhagwanpur community development blocks.

Bachhwara Assembly constituency is part of No. 24 Begusarai (Lok Sabha constituency).

Members of Legislative Assembly

Election results

2020

2015

References

External links
 

mansurchak block

Assembly constituencies of Bihar
Politics of Begusarai district